Objects in the Mirror Are Closer Than They Appear may refer to:

 Objects in the Mirror Are Closer Than They Appear (Confrontation Camp album), 2000
 Objects in the Mirror Are Closer Than They Appear (Nancy Moran album), 1993

See also
Objects in mirror are closer than they appear, a safety warning
"Objects in the Rear View Mirror May Appear Closer than They Are", a song by Meat Loaf
"Objects in the Mirror" (song), a 2002 song by Prince from the album One Nite Alone...